XESPN is a radio station that serves the Tijuana-San Diego area. As of May 22, 2022, it is off the air.

800 AM is Mexican clear-channel frequency, on which XEROK-AM is the dominant Class A station.

History

The station came on air in April 1965 as XEMMM, named for its owner, Mario Marcos Mayans (part of the Mayans family that owns CBC). The station initially broadcast during the daytime only.

XEMMM joined ESPN Radio in late 2002, replacing XETRA, which had changed from sports radio to adult standards some months earlier. In 2003, the call sign changed to XESPN. (The XEMMM calls were moved to a station Cadena Baja California then owned in Mexicali, now XEMMM-AM 940.) In 2009, ESPN Radio moved to sister FM station XHMORE while XESPN joined ESPN Deportes Radio.

On November 1, 2010, CBC ceased sports programming on XESPN and adopted a news/talk format programmed by Grupo Imagen. ESPN Deportes Radio is now available in the San Diego-Tijuana border region on XESS-AM 620. Imagen's news programming was later replaced on XESPN with programming from Radio Fórmula.

On May 22, 2022, XESPN went off the air, and its programming was moved to online only.

Previous logo

References

External links

Radio stations in Tijuana
Spanish-language radio stations
News and talk radio stations in Mexico